Adolfo Larrue Martínez III (born September 27, 1948) is an American actor and singer with roles in the daytime soap operas Santa Barbara, General Hospital, One Life to Live, The Bold and the Beautiful, and Days of Our Lives, and the primetime dramas L.A. Law, Profiler, and Longmire. His feature films include The Cowboys (1972), Powwow Highway (1989), Curse of Chucky (2013), and Ambulance (2022).

Early life and education

Martinez was born Adolfo Larrue Martínez III in Glendale, California. His family referred to him as "A", "Little Adolfo", and "Little A" as a child to distinguish him from his father and grandfather. Over time, "A" became the name he would use. His heritage is Mexican and Apache on his father's side, and Piegan Blackfeet and Northern European on his mother's side.

Martinez attended Sunland Elementary School and Mt. Gleason Junior High School in Sunland/Tujunga, where he played Kiwanis youth softball each summer (he was a formidable pitcher) and starred in numerous school musical productions.
He graduated from Verdugo Hills High School in Tujunga, Los Angeles, CA. In high school, he was in a rock band and was on the track team. 

After intending to study political science  at UCLA, he turned to acting instead.

Career
Martinez began his professional career at age 12, as a singer, and earned a talent competition title at the Hollywood Bowl. He played on a semi-pro baseball team for five seasons.

Film
Martinez has starred in feature films including:

The Cowboys (1972), Starbird & Sweet William (1973), Once Upon a Scoundrel (1974), Joe Panther (1976), Shoot the Sun Down (1978), The Honorary Consul (1983), Walking the Edge (1985), Powwow Highway (1989), She-Devil (1989), The Cherokee Kid (1996), What's Cooking? (2000), Wind River (2000), Curse of Chucky (2013), and Ambulance (2022).

Television

The majority of his acting roles have been on television. He had a significant appearance, playing the stable hand Luis, who aids Little Joe on Bonanza "Gideon the Good" in 1970.  Also, in 1970 he appeared in the episode "Log 114--The Hero" on Adam-12 (S2/Ep22). He had a recurring role on All in the Family as a helper at Archie's bar. In 1973, he appeared in the Hawaii Five-0 episode "A Bullet for El Diablo". In 1974, he appeared in an episode of the short-lived ABC police drama Nakia]. In 1976, he played a novice bullfighter in the Columbo episode "A Matter of Honor". Martinez appeared as Tranquilino Marquez in three episodes of the mini-series Centennial in 1979.

In 1979 episode of Quincy, episode " Walk Softly Through the Night" Parts 1 and 2 he played a pre-med student. Air date 2/1/79

In 1979, Martínez made an appearance on Barney Miller, playing Claudio Ortiz in the sixth-season episode, "The DNA Story".  He returned in 1981 to enact Joseph Montoya in the episode "The Doll".

Martinez played a grape picker in 1982 on CBS's Falcon Crest, Native American 'Low Wolf' on the short-lived Born to the Wind, and a police detective in the 1983–1984 series Whiz Kids. In 1983 he had a guest role in a Season 5 episode of Hart to Hart as Jose. From 1984-1992 he played the role of Cruz Castillo on the daytime soap opera Santa Barbara. Martinez has also worked on prime time television, including starring roles in series such as Profiler and L.A. Law.

In September 2008, Martinez joined the cast of the ABC daytime drama One Life to Live in the role of Ray Montez and was written out in June 2009.

In February 2011, Martinez appeared in several episodes of the CBS daytime drama The Bold and the Beautiful as Dr. Ramon Montgomery. He returned in January 2012 for a few additional episodes.

In 2012, he landed the recurring role of Jacob Nighthorse in the television series Longmire.

In April 2014, it was rumored he was joining The Young and the Restless. In July 2014, he appeared on the NBC television show The Night Shift as Dr. Landry, de la Cruz's father. In late 2014, he also appeared in Othello on stage at the Odyssey Theatre in west Los Angeles.

From September 2015 to 2017, Martinez  appeared on the NBC daytime drama Days of Our Lives as Eduardo "Eddie" Hernandez. He returned to the show in 2020.

Martinez played Sheriff Mayo in the third season of the television series Queen of the South.

In June 2022, Martinez was cast as Master Pakku in the Netflix live-action series Avatar: The Last Airbender.

Awards
Over the years, Martinez has been nominated for numerous awards, and received some, including a Daytime Emmy Award, a Red Nation Film Award of Excellence, an award as Best Supporting Actor at the Red Dirt International Film Festival (for his own written short film called "Four Winds), and three from the Soap Opera Digest Awards.

Personal life
In 1981, he was married briefly to actress Mare Winningham, who was also cast on The Young Pioneers; they divorced later that year. In 1982, he married his current wife, Leslie Bryans; they have a son and two daughters. He moved from Malibu to Thousand Oaks, California in 2014.

References

External links

1948 births
Living people
20th-century American male actors
21st-century American male actors
Native American male actors
Hispanic and Latino American male actors
Hispanic and Latino American musicians
American male actors of Mexican descent
 Blackfoot people
American musicians of Mexican descent
American people of Apache descent
American people of Blackfoot descent
American male film actors
American male television actors
American male soap opera actors
Daytime Emmy Award winners
Daytime Emmy Award for Outstanding Lead Actor in a Drama Series winners
UCLA Film School alumni
Male actors from Glendale, California
Musicians from Glendale, California